The 2003 Progressive Conservative leadership election was held on May 31, 2003, to elect a leader of the Progressive Conservative Party of Canada. Peter MacKay was elected as leader to replace former Prime Minister Joe Clark, who then retired as party leader.  In the end, five candidates emerged as challengers for the leadership by the convention date.  Two other candidates had participated in the race but both withdrew as contestants before the vote. Quebec Member of Parliament (MP) André Bachand withdrew his candidacy from the race due to financial concerns and backed Peter MacKay. Former Cabinet Minister and Quebec MP Heward Grafftey also withdrew his candidacy from the race due to health concerns and backed David Orchard.

The results of the race produced immediate controversy when it emerged that winner Mackay had signed an agreement with David Orchard in order to get elected.  This deal promised the party would review the Canadian-American Free Trade Agreement, and that it would not cooperate or merge with the Canadian Alliance.  This controversy continued when MacKay ignored the agreement, and signed an agreement to merge his party with the Canadian Alliance to form the new Conservative Party of Canada. The merger was approved by party members in December 2003. After the merger was approved, Brison announced that he was defecting to the Liberals.

Candidates
Peter MacKay, 37, Member of Parliament for Central Nova, Nova Scotia, former Crown Attorney.(
Jim Prentice, 46, Calgary lawyer and past Progressive Conservative candidate for parliament.
David Orchard, 52, Saskatchewan farmer and campaigner against globalization and free trade. Runner-up in 1998 leadership election.
Scott Brison, 35, Member of Parliament for Kings—Hants, Nova Scotia.
Craig Chandler, 32, executive director of Progressive Group for Independent Business and a social conservative activist in Alberta. Ran on a Unite the Right platform calling on the Progressive Conservatives to merge with the Canadian Alliance.

Withdrawn
André Bachand, 41, Member of Parliament for Richmond—Arthabaska, Quebec. Withdrew to support  MacKay
Heward Grafftey, 74,  former MP for Brome—Missisquoi, Quebec (1958-1968, 1972–1980) and former Minister of State for Social Programs and Minister of State for Science and Technology (1979-1980).

Results

Chandler withdrew before voting began to endorse Prentice.  Estimates suggest that Chandler had six committed delegates from Calgary ridings who voted in favour of Prentice. After the second ballot, Brison dropped off and supported Prentice. Brison was the only candidate to gain votes on this ballot compared to his first ballot result; all of the other candidates lost votes. After the third ballot, Orchard threw his support to MacKay after the two men signed an agreement committing MacKay to not merge the PCs with the Canadian Alliance, and to hold a review of the Canada-U.S. Free Trade Agreement.

References

See also
Progressive Conservative leadership conventions
2004 Conservative Party of Canada leadership election

2003
2003 elections in Canada
Progressive Conservative leadership election
May 2003 events in Canada